Too or TOO may refer to:

 Threshold of originality, a concept in copyright law
 Too (Fantastic Plastic Machine album), the fourth studio album by Fantastic Plastic Machine
 Too (FIDLAR album), the second studio album by American skate punk band Fidlar
 Too (Kingdom Come album), the seventh album by the band Kingdom Come
 Too (Madita album), the second solo album by Matida
 Too (S.O.S. Band album), the second album by the band The S.O.S. Band
 To1, a South Korean boy band, formerly known as TOO

People with the surname Too
 David Kimutai Too (1968–2008), a Kenyan politician and National Assembly member for the Orange Democratic Movement
 Too Too (born 1990), a Burmese fighter

See also

 To (disambiguation)
 Toon (disambiguation)
 Toos (disambiguation)
 Tootoo, an Inuit surname
 TU (disambiguation)
 Two (disambiguation)

Kalenjin names